Arun N. Netravali (born 26 May 1945 in Mumbai, India) is an Indian-American computer engineer credited with contributions in digital technology including HDTV. He conducted research in digital compression, signal processing and other fields. Netravali was the ninth President of Bell Laboratories and has served as Lucent's Chief Technology Officer and Chief Network Architect. He received his undergraduate degree from IIT Bombay, India, and an M.S. and a Ph.D. from Rice University in Houston, Texas, all in electrical engineering. Several global universities, including the Ecole Polytechnique Federale in Lausanne, Switzerland, have honored him with honorary doctorates.

Netravali led Bell Labs research and development of high definition television (HDTV) and is widely acknowledged as a pioneer in the development of digital video technology. He is the author of over 170 technical papers, 70 patents, and three books in the areas of picture processing, digital television, and computer networks.

Netravali is a member of Tau Beta Phi and Sigma Xi. He is also an IEEE fellow. He has received awards including the Marconi Prize, the Padma Bhushan Award from the Indian government, the National Medal of Technology from President George W. Bush, the Computers & Communications Prize, the Alexander Graham Bell Medal, the IEEE Kilby Medal, the IEEE Frederik Philips Award, and the National Association of Software and Services Companies in India Medal.

Prior to joining Bell Labs, Netravali was an adjunct professor at the Massachusetts Institute of Technology. While at Bell Labs, he taught at City College of New York, Columbia University, and Rutgers University.

He was a resident of Westfield, NJ.

Awards and honors 
Netravali has received numerous awards and honorary degrees, including
 the IEEE Jack S. Kilby Signal Processing Medal in 2001 (together with Thomas S. Huang)
 the IEEE Frederik Philips Award in 2001
 the U.S. National Medal of Technology
 the Padma Bhushan from the Government of India
 the IEEE Alexander Graham Bell Medal in 1991 (together with C. Chapin Cutler and John O. Limb)
 elected to member of the National Academy of Engineering in 1989
 elected to IEEE Fellow in 1985
 the IEEE Donald G. Fink Prize Paper Award in 1982 (together with John O. Limb)

Selected writing 
 Arun N. Netravali and Barry G. Haskell, Digital Pictures: Representation, Compression and Standards (Applications of Communications Theory), Springer (second edition, 1995),

References

External links 
 Laureate profile at The Spirit of American Innovation

Columbia University faculty
American people of Indian descent
Rice University alumni
Living people
Indian emigrants to the United States
National Medal of Technology recipients
Recipients of the Padma Bhushan in science & engineering
1946 births
IIT Bombay alumni
Members of the United States National Academy of Engineering
American chief technology officers
Businesspeople from Mumbai
Fellow Members of the IEEE
Bell Labs